Sunshine railway station is located on the North Coast line in Queensland, Australia. It serves the Brisbane suburb of Geebung. On 28 August 2000, a third platform opened as part of the addition of a third track from Northgate to Bald Hills.

Services
Sunshine is served by all City network services from Kippa-Ring to Central, many continuing to Springfield Central

Services by platform

References

External links

Sunshine station Queensland Rail
Sunshine station Queensland's Railways on the Internet

Railway stations in Brisbane
North Coast railway line, Queensland